Fournel is a surname. Notable people with the surname include:

 Amelia Fournel (born 1977), Argentine sport shooter
 Émilie Fournel (born 1986), Canadian canoeist
 Hugues Fournel (born 1988), Canadian canoeist
 Jean Fournel (1956–1997), Canadian canoeist
 Paul Fournel (born 1947), French writer